Pristobrycon is a genus of piranhas from the Orinoco and Amazon Basins, as well as rivers in the Guianas.

Pristobrycon is not monophyletic. No single morphological feature has been found that completely diagnoses this genus. P. striolatus is very different from other species of this genus.

The genus Pristobrycon was created by Eigenmann to include species which have intermediate characters between "the fierce Rooseveltiella [=Pygocentrus nattereri] without palatine teeth, and the less blood-thirsty Serrasalmus with a series of permanent teeth along the palatine". The author designed P. calmoni as the type species of the genus. Two groups are included in this genus. One group is characterized by presence of the preanal spine (only P. calmoni) and the other group including the rest of the species assigned (P. careospinus, P. maculipinnis and P. striolatus) (Fink & Machado-Allison, 1992; Machado-Allison et al., 1989; Machado-Allison & Fink, 1996). The validity P. aureus is questionable.

Species
There are currently five recognized species in this genus:
 Pristobrycon aureus (Spix & Agassiz, 1829)
 Pristobrycon calmoni (Steindachner, 1908)
 Pristobrycon careospinus W. L. Fink & Machado-Allison, 1992
 Pristobrycon maculipinnis W. L. Fink & Machado-Allison, 1992
 Pristobrycon striolatus (Steindachner, 1908)

Notes

References
 
 Eigenmann, C. 1915. The Serrasalminae and Mylinae. Annals of the Carnegie Museum, IX(3-4):226-272 + plates.
 Fink, W. & A. Machado-Allison. 1992. Three new species of piranhas from Venezuela and Brazil. Ichthyological Explorations of Freshwaters, 2(1):57-71.
 Machado/Allison, A. W. Fink & M.E. Antonio. 1989(1990). Revisión del género Serrasalmus (Lacepede, 1803) y géneros relacionados de Venezuela: I. notas sobre la morfología y sistemática de Pristobrycon striolatus (Steindachner, 1908). Acta Biologica Venezuelica, 12(3-4):140-171.
 Machado-Allison & W. Fink. 1996. Los Peces Caribes de Venezuela: diagnosis, claves y aspectos ecológicos y evolutivos. Universidad Central de Venezuela. CDCH (Colección Monografías). 149p. 

Serrasalmidae
Taxa named by Carl H. Eigenmann
Fish of South America